The Mandela Rhodes Building is a Cape Dutch revival building situated in Cape Town, South Africa.

History 
The building, built in 1903, was designed by famous architect Herbert Baker to house the newly founded De Beers mining corporation. At this time, it was known as the Rhodes House after Cecil John Rhodes.

In 2003, it was gifted by Nicky Oppenheimer, De Beers chairperson, to the Mandela Rhodes Foundation, becoming the seat of its headquarters.

Description 
The building is located at the corner of St George's Mall and Wale Street in Cape Town's City Bowl.

References

External links

Buildings and structures in Cape Town
Herbert Baker buildings and structures